Dussault Inc. is a docu-sitcom television show about struggling fashion business. The series is conceived and produced by Paperny Entertainment and directed by Ziad Touma. Season 1 was broadcast on Saturdays at 8:30pm on Citytv. Season 2 was broadcast Saturdays at 8 pm on Bio Canada.

Synopsis
Jason Dussault is a Canadian celebrity streetwear designer in partnership with Mashiah Vaughn. They both launched a flagship store "Dussault Apparel" in Vancouver, selling high-priced custom-made jeans, hoodies, and baseball caps to rock-and-roll celebrities. But when the economy took a turn for the worse, they lost it all.

Now, back in Vancouver with two sons to raise, 15-year-old Ayden (a son of Mashiah from an earlier relation Jesee) and 3-year-old Ronin – Jason is risking everything to bring "Dussault Apparel" back, while Mashiah is promoting her own bath cosmetics line called "Open Sundaes".

With relationship challenges, heated family feuds, and tight budgets, and to raise two kids, it is a big task.

Cast
Jason Dussault as himself
Mashiah Vaughn-Hulbert as herself
Fiona Forbes as herself
Ayden as himself
Ronin as himself

Episodes
Season 1
New Showroom (September 24, 2011)
Warrior Ring (October 1, 2011)
Snowboard Panda (October 8, 2011)
Burlesque Beauties (October 15, 2011)
Hong Kong City (October 22, 2011) 
The Ultimate Fight (October 29, 2011) 
Ronin's Elephants
Don't Break My Art
A Place to Call Home
Cowboys and Angels
Another Brick in the Wall
Africa Calling
Hollywood Dreaming
The Swimsuit Issues
Sex Therapy
What Happens in Vegas

Season 2
Hollywood or Bust
Design Challenges
Street Cred
Mischievous
Double-Cross
A Star Is Porn
Rebounds
Hulk Smash
Poker Face
Teen Spirit
Two Birds, One Stone
What's Eating Gilbert Gottfried
French Touch
The Duke Is Hazzard
Time Off
Should I Stay or Should I Go?

External links

Paperny Entertainment website
Dussault Inc. website
Dussault Apparel website
Dussault Inc. Facebook

2011 Canadian television series debuts
2012 Canadian television series endings
2000s Canadian reality television series
Citytv original programming
Television series by Entertainment One